The Crimea Regional Committee of the Communist Party of Ukraine, commonly referred to as the Crimea CPU obkom, was the position of highest authority in the Crimean Oblast (1954–1991) of the Ukrainian SSR (from February 19, 1954). The position was created on November 20, 1920, and abolished on August 26, 1991. The First Secretary was a de facto appointed position usually by the Central Committee the Communist Party of Ukraine or the First Secretary of the Republic.

Before 1954 the regional committee was part of the Crimean ASSR (1921–1945) and Crimean Oblast (1945–1954) of the Russian SFSR.

List of First Secretaries of the Crimea Regional Committee of the Communist Party of the Soviet Union

List of First Secretaries of the Crimea Regional Committee of the Communist Party of Ukraine

See also
List of Chairmen of the Executive Committee of Crimea
Crimean ASSR
Crimean Oblast

Notes

Sources
 World Statesmen.org

1920 establishments in Russia
1991 disestablishments in the Soviet Union
Regional Committees of the Communist Party of the Soviet Union
Regional Committees of the Communist Party of Ukraine (Soviet Union)
Russian Soviet Federative Socialist Republic
Ukrainian Soviet Socialist Republic
Crimea in the Soviet Union